is a Kitakyūshū Monorail station in Kokuraminami-ku, Kitakyūshū, Japan. Shii-Kōen Station on the JR Kyushu Hitahikosan Line is nearby.

History
The station opened on 9 January 1985.

Station layout
The elevated station has two side platforms with two tracks.

Platforms

References

Railway stations in Japan opened in 1985